The 1913 Tour de France was the 11th edition of Tour de France, one of cycling's Grand Tours. The Tour began in Paris on 29 June and Stage 9 occurred on 15 July with a flat stage from Aix-en-Provence. The race finished in Paris on 27 July.

Stage 9
15 July 1913 — Aix-en-Provence to Nice,

Stage 10
17 July 1913 — Nice to Grenoble,

Stage 11
19 July 1913 — Grenoble to Geneva,

Stage 12
21 July 1913 — Geneva to Belfort,

Stage 13
23 July 1913 — Belfort to Longwy,

Stage 14
25 July 1913 — Longwy to Dunkerque,

Stage 15
27 July 1913 — Dunkerque to Paris,

References

1913 Tour de France
Tour de France stages